Rajkarnikar (Devanagari: राजकर्णिकार)  are a newar clan of confectioners and sweet makers situated in Kathmandu Valley, in Nepal.

Etymology and origin 
The name "Rajkarnikar" means state official. 

Rajkarnikars in Nepal are found mostly in Yen or Kathmandu Valley, over the regions of Kathmandu, Bhaktapur and Lalitpur (Patan in Nepali; Yela in Newari );  In 2011, their population was 83,000. Around 60,000 still reside in rural areas, and around 20,000 in urban areas. They speak Nepalbhasa. The ethologist and anthropologist, Brian Houghton Hodgson, during his posting in Nepal, Hodgson became proficient in Nepali and Newari. They are part of Newar clans and descendants of Kirat People.

Traditional Occupation 
Halwais are sweet makers by tradition. They take on many responsibilities that are considered religiously important. Traditional sweets prepared include Jeri, Swari, and Haluwa.

Rajkarnikars are Newar and have their own caste system. The caste-system for Newars are based on profession.  

They are in Kathmandu Valley also originates from their tradition and profession of confectionery. The Halwai people group, also known as the Palma Halwais or Rajkarnikar, are part of a Newar clan and were the original inhabitants of the Kathmandu Valley in Nepal. The traditional occupation of the Halwai people is making candy and sweets, known as "mithai."

Culture 
Traditionally, in the caste system, they follow Vajrayan Buddhism.

Their culture, traditions, religions, beliefs and rooted to Asia, Tibet , and Nepal.

The worshiping of Kumari, Taleju Bhawani, Ganesh, Harati Ajima, Aakash bhairav, and Bhin Dyo is one of major worshipping for Halwai people. 

'They also believe in worshipping ancestors and believe in continued existence of life. They celebrate festivals, such as Yenya Puni, Yomari Punhi, Janbahadyah Salegu, Pahanchaare and perform pilgrimage during the month of Gunlaa.

Social status 

Rajkarnikar is a highly respected caste. Their status as providers of food for their community also makes them responsible for making sweets and cakes. These are made for all festivals and celebrations, such as marriage or childbirth.

See also 

 Nepal Mandal 
Newar Caste System
Caste System in Nepal
Yenya
Akash Bhairava
Yalamaber

References 

 Brian Houghton Hodgson

Newar caste system